The Government of Goiás, a state in Brazil, includes an executive, the State Governor, a Legislative Assembly and a judiciary. The State Governor is directly elected for 1-2 four year terms. The main governmental headquarters is called the Palácio das Esmeraldas. The judiciary includes the Court of Justice and other courts.

Executive 
As of 2011, the Governor was Marconi Perillo, and the Vice-Governor was José Eliton Júnior.

Legislative 
The legislature is located in the state capital, and meets at Alfredo Nasser Palace. It includes 41 elected deputies, who server four year terms. The president of the assembly was Jardel Sebba. The first substitute was Fábio Sousa.

Judiciary 
The highest court in Goiás is the Court of Justice of the State of Goiás. It has a president, Vítor Barbosa Lenza, and a Vice President, Leobino Valente Chaves. Its comptroller was Beatriz Figueiredo Franco.

External links 
 State of Goiás Legislative Assembly
 Court of the State of Goias
 Public ministry of the State of Goiás
 Government of Goiás

 
Goiás